Hanwangling Park station is a subway station in Changsha, Hunan, China, operated by the Changsha subway operator Changsha Metro.

Station layout
The station has one island platform.

History
Construction began on July 13, 2015. The station opened on 26 May 2019.

Surrounding area
 South Village School
 Archaeological Site Park of the Han Dynasty King's Mausoleum in Changsha

References

Railway stations in Hunan
Railway stations in China  opened in 2019